Nadia Chambers (born 13 January 1968 in Bridgend) is a Welsh actress.  She is the youngest of four children. Chambers moved to London in 1981 to attend stage school.

Career
From 1982 to 1985, Chambers played the role of Annette Firman in the television series Grange Hill. She also appeared as Miss Anne de Bourgh in the 1995 mini series Pride and Prejudice and made guest appearances in episodes of The Bill.

Acting roles
Pride and Prejudice as Anne de Bourgh (1995)
The Bill
Your Shout as Trish (1991)
Pickup as Tracey (1989)
Little Dorrit as Agnes (1988)
Grange Hill as Annette Firman (1982–1985).

References

External links

1968 births
Welsh television actresses
Welsh soap opera actresses
Welsh film actresses
Living people